The 2007 Sandown GT Classic was the eighth and final round of the 2007 Australian GT Championship season.  It took place at Sandown Raceway in Victoria, Australia on 9 December 2007 over a duration of 210 minutes.

The race was won by the Sirena racing driver pairing of Danish driver Allan Simonsen and his co-driver Tim Leahey who joined the team just for this race. The Sirena Ferrari F430 finished a full two laps ahead of the Lamborghini Gallardo Ian Palmer and Paul Stokell. John Teulan and Steven Johnson finished third, another two laps behind.

Results

Statistics
 Pole position - #80 Sirena Racing - 1:11.5544
 Fastest lap - #38 World of Learning - 1:13.3227

2007 Australian Tourist Trophy
The 2007 Australian Tourist Trophy was awarded by CAMS to the winners of the 2007 Sandown GT Classic. It was the eighteenth Australian Tourist Trophy, and the first to be awarded since 1979.

References

External links
 European Car Club of Australia page with images of all competing cars, as archived at www.webcitation.org

Australian GT Championship
Sandown GT Classic
Motorsport at Sandown